George Town Airport  is an abandoned airport located near George Town on the island of Great Exuma in The Bahamas which is closed for civilian use.

Facilities

Accidents and incidents
On 3 February 1998, Douglas C-47A N200MF of Missionary Flights International crashed on approach to George Town Airport. The aircraft was on a passenger flight from Cap-Haitien International Airport, Haiti when an engine failed shortly after take-off. The crew decided to return to George Town but the second engine failed on approach. All 26 on board survived.

See also
 Exuma International Airport (IATA: GGT, ICAO: MYEF), located near Moss Town.

References

Airports in the Bahamas
Exuma